Edgar Leon Bateman Jr. (born January 11, 1929 – May 18, 2010) was an American jazz drummer. He first recorded with Walt Dickerson and would later work with Eric Dolphy, Herbie Hancock, and Booker Ervin. His final recording was with Khan Jamal. He neither smoke nor drank alcohol and was said to be health conscious. He had rheumatic fever as a child and was from St. Louis. In St. Louis he and Oliver Nelson were in high school band together.

Discography

As sideman
With Walt Dickerson
 A Sense of Direction (New Jazz, 1961)
 Plays Unity (Audio Fidelity, 1964)
 Walt Dickerson 1976 (Whynot, 1976)
 Serendipity (SteepleChase, 1977)

With others
 Dave Burns, Dave Burns (Vanguard, 1962)
 Ted Curson, Urge (Fontana, 1966)
 Orrin Evans, Blessed Ones (Criss Cross 2001)
 Khan Jamal, Impressions of Coltrane (SteepleChase, 2009)
 John Handy, Jazz: John Handy III (Roulette, 1962)
 Ken McIntyre, Way Way Out (United Artists, 1963)
 Jamaaladeen Tacuma, The Night of Chamber Music (Moers Music, 1993)

References 

Musicians from Philadelphia
Musicians from St. Louis
1929 births
2010 deaths
American jazz drummers
Jazz musicians from Pennsylvania
Jazz musicians from Missouri